Sir Edgar Ignatius Godfrey Unsworth, KBE, CMG, QC (18 April 1906 – 15 March 2006) was a British lawyer and judge. He served as both Attorney-General for Northern Rhodesia and Chief Justice of Gibraltar during his long legal career.

He attended Stonyhurst College and Manchester University (LLB Hons) and studied law at Gray's Inn, where he was called to the bar in 1930. He was in private practice from 1930 to 1937 before accepting the post as a Crown Counsel in Northern Nigeria. He afterwards served as Attorney-General of Northern Rhodesia (1951–56) and of the Federation of Nigeria (1956–60) before serving two years as Federal Justice of the Federal Supreme Court.

He then took the post of Chief Justice of Nyasaland (1962–64) and was appointed Chief Justice of Gibraltar the following year. He was knighted in 1963.

At the time of his death, he was the second to last person originally appointed as “King's Counsel”, before the accession of Elizabeth II.

Death
He died in 2006, a month before his centenary. He never married.

References

External links
 Obituary notice

Sources
 Burke's Peerage & Gentry LLC. (Burke's Peerage & Baronetage 107th Edition, Burke's Landed Gentry 19th Edition)
 Burke's Peerage Partnership. (Burke's Landed Gentry 18th Edition)

1906 births
2006 deaths
People educated at Stonyhurst College
Alumni of the University of Manchester
Members of Gray's Inn
20th-century King's Counsel
English barristers
Chief Justices of Nyasaland
Knights Commander of the Order of the British Empire
Companions of the Order of St Michael and St George
Chief justices of Gibraltar
Attorneys-General of Northern Rhodesia
Members of the Legislative Council of Northern Rhodesia
20th-century Gibraltarian judges